Ján Varga (born 21 July 1990 in Levice) is a Slovak football player who currently plays for FK Slovan Levice. His former club was MFK Dubnica. He made his debut for MFK Dubnica against FC ViOn Zlaté Moravce on 30 April 2011.

External links
MFK Dubnica profile

References

1990 births
Living people
Slovak footballers
FK Dubnica players
Slovak Super Liga players
People from Levice
Sportspeople from the Nitra Region
Association football forwards